Succinctness is a characteristic.

Succinct may also refer to:
Succinct game, in algorithmic game theory
Succinct problems with respect to the P versus NP problem
Succinct data structure, a data structure in computer science

See also